Steve DiStanislao (born 1963) is an American drummer.

David Gilmour
DiStanislao toured and recorded with Pink Floyd guitarist David Gilmour, promoting his solo album On an Island. The touring band featured Pink Floyd keyboardist Richard Wright and occasional Floyd collaborator Dick Parry on saxophones. Also featured were long-time Gilmour collaborators Guy Pratt on bass and Jon Carin on keyboards, lap steel and vocals as well as Roxy Music's Phil Manzanera on guitars and vocals, who also co-produced On an Island.

The tour included three nights at the Royal Albert Hall with special guests David Bowie, Crosby & Nash, Robert Wyatt, Mica Paris and Nick Mason. Other performances took place in St. Mark's Square in Venice.

The last official show of the tour took place in Gdańsk, Poland where the band were joined by conductor Zbigniew Preisner and The Polish Baltic Philharmonic Orchestra, to celebrate the 26th anniversary of Solidarity of the Shipyard Worker's Union in Gdańsk. Over 55,000 fans turned out for this concert. The show was documented on Gilmour's live album Live in Gdańsk (2008).

In January 2007, DiStanislao, along with Guy Pratt and Richard Wright joined Gilmour at his barn at his home in Sussex, England for a series of jamming sessions. The sessions consisted of the band playing instrumental material composed by Gilmour. These instrumental pieces are known as the Barn Jams; three of which appear on the 4-disc edition and deluxe edition of Live in Gdańsk and four further pieces emerged on the deluxe edition of Gilmour's 2015 release Rattle That Lock.

DiStanislao appears on Gilmour's Rattle That Lock (2015) album, on five of the album's ten tracks including its title track as well as performing on the subsequent "Rattle That Lock" Tour 2015-2016, which was captured on the live album and video Live at Pompeii.

Don Felder
Steve tours regularly with the Don Felder Band.

References

Living people
American rock drummers
1963 births
20th-century American drummers
American male drummers
20th-century American male musicians